Jaylin Lucas (born September 24, 2004) is an American football running back and return specialist for the Indiana Hoosiers.

Early life and high school career 
Lucas attended Terrebonne High School in Houma, Louisiana for three years before transferring to Edna Karr High School in New Orleans after high family was forced to relocate due to Hurricane Ida. A 3 star prospect ranked the 41st best recruit in Louisiana, Lucas originally committed to play college football at Tulane, before flipping to Indiana.

College career 
As a freshman, Lucas served as a rotational running back and as a punt/kick returner, and was the only player in FBS football with multiple kick returns for touchdowns. At the conclusion of his freshman season, Lucas was named the Big Ten Rodgers–Dwight Return Specialist of the Year and a member of the first team All-Big Ten as a returnman.

References

External links
 Indiana Hoosiers bio

2004 births
Living people
American football return specialists
American football running backs
Indiana Hoosiers football players
People from Houma, Louisiana
Players of American football from Louisiana